James Graham Leechman, Lord Leechman (6 October 1906 - May 1986) was a Scottish advocate and judge.

Career 
Leechman was the son of the Walter Graham Leechman, a solicitor in Glasgow.  He was educated at Glasgow High School and at Glasgow University, and admitted as an advocate in 1932. He served in the Royal Air Force during World War II, then resumed his legal practice and took silk in 1949.

In 1964, he was appointed as Solicitor General for Scotland in Harold Wilson's first government. He held that post until the following year, when he was appointed as a judge to the College of Justice, replacing Charles Shaw, Baron Kilbrandon.  He was cautious when hearing trials, and deferred to other judges in appeal cases.

Leechman retired from the judiciary in 1976, and then edited some of his session cases.

Personal life 

Leechman married Margaret Helen Edgar in 1935.  They had two daughters.

He died in May 1986, aged 79.

References 

1906 births
1986 deaths
People educated at the High School of Glasgow
Alumni of the University of Glasgow
Members of the Faculty of Advocates
Scottish King's Counsel
20th-century King's Counsel
Solicitors General for Scotland
Senators of the College of Justice
Royal Air Force personnel of World War II